Wei Chen is a Chinese-American mechanical engineer known for her work on robust engineering design, robust design of experiments, metamodeling in design, uncertainty quantification, and design under uncertainty. She is the Wilson-Cook Professor in Engineering Design at Northwestern University, where she chairs the mechanical engineering department.

Education and career
Chen earned a bachelor's degree in mechanical engineering from Shanghai Jiao Tong University, a master's degree from the University of Houston, and a Ph.D. from the Georgia Institute of Technology, completed in 1995. She joined the Northwestern University faculty in 2003.

She is the editor-in-chief of the ASME Journal of Mechanical Design and president of the International Society for Structural and Multidisciplinary Optimization. She became chair of mechanical engineering at Northwestern in 2020.

Book
Chen is the coauthor with Christopher Hoyle and Henk Jan Wassenaar of the book Decision-based Design: Integrating Consumer Preferences into Engineering Design (Springer, 2012). She is also a co-editor of several edited volumes.

Recognition
Chen was the 2006 winner of the Ralph R. Teetor Educational Award of SAE International. She was named a Fellow of the American Society of Mechanical Engineers in 2009, and was elected to the National Academy of Engineering in 2019 "for contributions to design under uncertainty in products and systems, and leadership in the engineering design community".

References

External links
Home page at Northwestern Integrated DEsign Automation Laboratory

Year of birth missing (living people)
Living people
Chinese mechanical engineers
Chinese women engineers
American mechanical engineers
American women engineers
Shanghai Jiao Tong University alumni
University of Houston alumni
Georgia Tech alumni
Northwestern University faculty
Fellows of the American Society of Mechanical Engineers
Members of the United States National Academy of Engineering
American women academics
21st-century American women